Gilles-François, count of Graimberg, lord of Belleau, viscount of Vaustin (28 March 1748 – 4 May 1823) was a French officer and politician. He is also notable as the father of the artist Charles de Graimberg.

Life
He was born at Belleau Castle and became an officer in the régiment du Roi-Infanterie, then a lieutenant to the Marshals of France. On 13 May 1789 he was elected to the Estates General of 1789 as a noble deputy for the bailiwick of Château-Thierry. He sat in his order's minority and on 30 June 1789 wrote a declaration stating:

Disapproving of how the Revolution was developing, he resigned as a deputy on 8 July 1791, emigrated and became a captain in the régiment de Dillon, a French Royalist unit fighting alongside the British. He returned to France under the First French Empire and remained in retirement at Belleau until his death.

Sources

External links
  Assemblée nationale biography
 Portrait on NYE antiques

People from Aisne
1748 births
1823 deaths
French Royalist military leaders of the French Revolutionary Wars
Knights of the Order of Saint Louis